Bernhard Zimmermann (born 15 February 2002) is an Austrian professional footballer who plays as a forward for Rapid Wien.

Professional career
Zimmermann gave his professional debut for Rapid Wien on 27 February 2022 against WSG Tirol. A week later, on 6 March 2022 he scored his first professional goals with a brace in a win against Austria Klagenfurt.

On 4 March 2022, Zimmermann extended his contract with Rapid Wien until 2025.

Career statistics

Club

References

External links
 ÖFB profile
 RapidArchiv
 Soccerway

2002 births
Living people
People from Korneuburg
Austrian footballers
Austria youth international footballers
SK Rapid Wien players
Austrian Football Bundesliga players
Association football defenders
Footballers from Lower Austria